Hulbuk, formerly Vose' (Восеъ), Poytug (Пойтуғ) is the capital of the Vose' District of the Khatlon Region, Tajikistan. It had an estimated population of 24,500 as of 2020.

Geography

Climate
Hulbuk has a cold semi-arid climate (Köppen climate classification BSk). The average annual temperature is 16.4 °C (61.5 °F). The warmest month is July with an average temperature of 29 °C (84.2 °F) and the coolest month is January with an average temperature of 2.8 °C (37 °F).

History 

It is suspected that Hulbuk, a medieval town, housed the Banijurids, a Turco-Iranian dynasty from the eastern region of Central Asia.  Hulbuk allegedly facilitated a rich and powerful court suspected by the palatial and monumental architecture found in the region. In 1953 the initial excavation took place for more than 40 years and uncovered a citadel.  Unfortunately no topographical map has been drawn of the site.  The citadel is thought to be built as a stronghold, lending support that it was used by the dynasty.

References

Populated places in Khatlon Region
Cities in Central Asia